"Youth of America" is Birdbrain's final and most successful single. It was the first single from their 1997 album Let's Be Nice, and was featured in the hit film Scream.
It can also be heard in the movie Masterminds starring Patrick Stewart and Vincent Kartheiser.

Music video
The video features parts of Scream, along with footage of the band driving in a van, and playing at the scene of a murder.

References

1997 singles
Birdbrain (band) songs
TVT Records singles
1997 songs